This is a list of notable people who were born in or near, or have been residents of the English city of Sheffield.

Arts and humanities
Sidney Oldall Addy, folklorist and historian
Charles Herbert Aslin, architect
Samuel Bailey, philosopher and author
William Sterndale Bennett, composer
Clifford Edmund Bosworth, historian
Malcolm Bradbury, author
Michael Brennan, photographer
A. S. Byatt, novelist
Edward Carpenter, poet and activist
Sir Francis Legatt Chantrey, sculptor
Paul Conneally, poet, artist, musician
Thomas Creswick, painter
Thomas Wingate Todd, anthropologist, orthodontist
Margaret Drabble, novelist
Ebenezer Elliott, poet
William Empson, literary critic and Professor of English at the University of Sheffield
William Flockton, architect
Sarah Frankcom, artistic director of the Royal Exchange Theatre, Manchester
Alfred Gatty, Church of England priest and author
Robert Murray Gilchrist, novelist
Dave Godin, writer and journalist, authority on black American soul music
Mary Anne Everett Green, historian
William John Hale, architect
Joanne Harris, author (most famously of Chocolat)
Barry Hines, author
Barbara Hofland, children's writer
John Holland, poet and journalist
Linda Hoy, author
Joseph Hunter, antiquarian and historian
Mary Hutton, radical labouring-class poet
Charles Sargeant Jagger, sculptor
David Jennings, composer
Alice Kipling, poet
Robert Eadon Leader, journalist and historian
W. C. Leng, journalist
Marina Lewycka, author
Arthur Lismer, artist
Stephen Mallinder, musician, writer, broadcaster and academic
Steve McCaffery, poet
James Montgomery, editor and poet
Charles Mozley, artist
Geoff Nicholson, author
Bruce Oldfield, fashion designer
John C. Parkin, architect
Bernard Rands, composer
Jack Rosenthal, playwright
Stanley Royle, a post-impressionist landscape painter
Margaret Ryder, artist
Joe Scarborough, artist
Si Spencer, TV dramatist and graphic novelist
Kenneth Steel, artist
Frederick Varley, artist
White Watson, geologist, sculptor, stonemason and carver
John Dodsley Webster, architect
Khalid Yasin, Islamic lecturer
Glenn Gregory, musician, lead vocalist with Heaven 17

Business
Charles Boot, of Henry Boot & Co., developer of Pinewood Studios
Carrie Rose, entrepreneur
John Brown, industrialist
John George Graves, entrepreneur and philanthropist
David James Richards, entrepreneur and multi-millionaire technologist
Lee Strafford, technology entrepreneur and philanthropist`
Peter Stringfellow, multi-millionaire businessman
Joseph William Thornton, confectioner, founder of Thorntons
Thomas William Ward, industrialist and shipbreaker

Entertainment
Owen Aaronovitch, actor
Ray Ashcroft, actor
Derek Bailey, musician, writer
Nick Banks, musician, drummer for Pulp
Jason Leaver, DJ, artist, broadcaster 
Matthew Bannister, BBC Radio 5 Live presenter
Matthew Barley, cellist
Vikram Barn, YouTuber, member and co-founder of the Sidemen
Keith Barron, actor
Josephine Barstow, opera singer
Arthur Baynes, aka Stainless Stephen, music hall comedian
Sean Bean, actor
Dave Berry, musician
J. Stuart Blackton, film producer
Gavin Bryars, musician
Alastair Burnet, news reader
Marti Caine, comedian
Tony Capstick, comedian, actor, musician and broadcaster
Paul Carrack, musician, singer of Ace, Squeeze and Mike and the Mechanics
Joanne Catherall, musician, singer in The Human League
Steve Clark, musician, late Def Leppard guitarist
Jessica-Jane Clement, actor, model
Jarvis Cocker, musician, lead singer of Pulp
Joe Cocker, singer
Maurice Colbourne, actor
Christopher Colquhoun, actor
Jamie Cook, musician, guitarist for the Arctic Monkeys
Henry Coward, choral conductor
Richard Coyle, actor and comedian
Thomas Craig, actor
Stephen Daldry, film director
Johnny Danvers, actor and comedian
Bruce Dickinson, musician, lead singer of Iron Maiden
Reginald Dixon, organist, pianist and radio presenter
Candida Doyle, keyboard player with Pulp
Steve Edwards, singer
Joe Elliott, musician, lead singer of Def Leppard
Graham Fellows, comedian, actor, known as "John Shuttleworth"
Toby Foster, comedian, works for BBC Radio Sheffield; possibly from Barnsley
Martin Fry, musician, lead singer of ABC
Margaret Gale, opera singer
Mark Gasser, pianist
Liam Gerrard, actor
Peter Glossop, opera singer
Brian Glover, actor and wrestler
Michael Grandage, theatre director
Christopher Green, writer and performer
Richard Hawley, musician, formerly of The Longpigs
Paul Heaton, musician, formerly of The Beautiful South
Matthew Helders, musician, drummer for the Arctic Monkeys
Elizabeth Henstridge, actress
Stephanie Hill, classical-crossover vocalist and Miss England 2017/18
Steven Houghton, actor and singer
Charlotte Hudson, television presenter
Robert Hudson, actor
Jayne Irving, television presenter
Stephen Jones, musician and novelist, formerly of Babybird
Richard H. Kirk, musician
Skelton Knaggs, actor
Bobby Knutt, actor and comedian
Ann Lee, singer, songwriter, dancer
Tim Lever, music producer
Susan Littler, actor
James Lomas, Olivier Award-winning actor
Steve Mackey, bass player with Pulp
Emily Maitlis, television presenter
Jonny Maudling, composer
Patricia Maynard, actor
Jon McClure, musician, frontman of Reverend and the Makers
James McCourt, television presenter
Richard McCourt, television presenter
Patrick McGoohan, actor
Philip Oakey, musician, lead singer of The Human League
Nick O'Malley, musician, bassist in Arctic Monkeys
Julian Ovenden, actor and singer
Tony Oxley, musician
Michael Palin, comedian, actor and travel presenter
Judy Parfitt, actor
Nick Park, animator and film director
Mike Percy, music producer
Angela Pleasence, actor
Donald Pleasence, actor
Martin Powell, former keyboardist of heavy metal band Cradle of Filth
John Rawling, sport commentator
Ian Reddington, actor
Rony Robinson, broadcaster and writer
Rick Savage, musician, bassist of Def Leppard
Russell Senior, musician, former guitarist for Pulp
David Slade, film director
Susan Ann Sulley, musician, singer in The Human League
Oliver Sykes, musician, lead singer of Bring Me The Horizon
Alex Turner, musician, vocalist and songwriter for the Arctic Monkeys
Anna Walker, television presenter
Dan Walker, television presenter
Martyn Ware, musician with Heaven 17
Paul Joseph Watson, internet personality, editor of InfoWars
Mark Webber, guitarist with Pulp
Dominic West, actor
Mark White, musician with ABC
Willie Williams, set designer and video director
Pete Willis, musician, former Def Leppard guitarist
Tom Wrigglesworth, comedian
Stuart Zender,  bassist, songwriter and record producer

Politics
Nick Ainger, politician
Clive Betts
David Blunkett, former Cabinet minister (Education Secretary, Home Secretary, and Work and Pensions Secretary)
William Broadhead, early trade unionist
Richard Caborn, former Minister for Sport
Brent Charlesworth, former Lord Mayor of Nottingham and also Sheriff of Nottingham
Nick Clegg, Liberal Democrat Leader 2007-2015 and Deputy Prime Minister 2010–2015
John Christopher Cutler, second governor of the State of Utah
William Dronfield, early trade unionist
George Hadfield, 19th-century politician
Evan Harris, Liberal Democrat politician
Enid Hattersley, Labour Party politician and Sheffield's Lord Mayor in 1981
Roy Hattersley, politician and writer
Samuel Holberry, Chartist
Isaac Ironside, Chartist
Helen Jackson
Oona King, politician
J. Batty Langley, politician and trade unionist
Nicholas Liverpool, President of Dominica
Frederick Mappin, cutler and politician
Mary, Queen of Scots, held under house arrest in Sheffield for 14 years
J. T. Murphy, leader of the Shops' Stewards Movement and the Communist Party of Great Britain
Sally Opppenheim, Conservative MP and Minister
John Parker, 19th-century politician
Sir Irvine Patnick OBE, politician and Conservative Party Whip under Margaret Thatcher and John Major
Samuel Plimsoll, politician and advocate of the Plimsoll line
Joseph Pointer, politician and trade unionist
Mark Serwotka, trade unionist
Derek Simpson, trade unionist
Angela Smith
Henry Stephenson, politician and businessman
George Talbot, 6th Earl of Shrewsbury, Earl Marshal and gaoler of Mary, Queen of Scots
Samuel Danks Waddy
G. H. B. Ward, campaigner for access to moorland
Cecil Henry Wilson, politician
Hugo Young, journalist and political commentator

Religion
John Balguy, divine and philosopher
Geoffrey Blythe, Bishop of Lichfield and Coventry 1503–c1530
John Blythe, Bishop of Salisbury 1493–1500
William Henry Brookfield, Anglican priest, Inspector of Schools, Chaplain-in-ordinary to Queen Victoria 1809–1874
Alexander Kilham, founder of the Methodist New Connexion church
James Moorhouse, Bishop of Manchester 1886–1903
Robert Sanderson, Bishop of Lincoln 1660–1663

Science and engineering
Richard Bentall, clinical psychologist
Henry Bessemer, engineer
Thomas Boulsover, inventor of Sheffield Plate
Harry Brearley, inventor of stainless steel
Leonard Cockayne, botanist
John Curr, coal mine and railway engineer
Samuel Earnshaw, mathematician
Charles Harding Firth, historian
Mark Firth, steel manufacturer
Sir John Fowler, railway engineer and co-designer of the Forth Railway Bridge
Robert Hadfield, innovator of steel alloys
Professor David Hughes, astronomer
Benjamin Huntsman, inventor and steel manufacturer
Amy Johnson, pioneering female aviator
Pieter Kok, co-developer of quantum interferometric optical lithography
Hans Adolf Krebs, biochemist, winner of the 1953 Nobel Prize in Physiology or Medicine
Sir Harry Kroto, chemist, winner of the 1996 Nobel Prize in Chemistry
Joseph Locke, railway engineer
Peter Maitlis, organometallic chemist
David Mellor, cutler
Frederick Brian Pickering, metallurgist
Juda Hirsch Quastel, biochemist
Helen Sharman, astronaut (first Briton in space)
Henry Clifton Sorby, microscopist and geologist
Richard J. Roberts, biochemist
John Roebuck, inventor
Grenville Turner, cosmochemist, noble gas geochemist
John Paul Wild, astronomer

Sport
Micky Adams, footballer
John Amaechi, NBA basketball player
Gordon Banks, footballer
Dominic Barrow, rugby player
Dave Bassett, football manager
Steven Bellamy, British karate team
Danny Bergara, footballer and football manager
Adam Blythe, cyclist
Kell Brook, professional boxer
Jon Brown, marathon runner
Lee Chapman, footballer
Charles Clegg, footballer and Chairman of the Football Association
William Clegg, footballer and politician
Sebastian Coe, track and field athlete
Geoffrey Cornu, cricketer
Tommy Crawshaw, footballer for England and Sheffield Wednesday
Lucy Creamer, climber
Phil Davis, professional footballer
Louis Dodds, football player
Derek Dooley, footballer
Jeff Eckhardt, football player 
Malcolm Elliott, professional cyclist
Jessica Ennis, track and field athlete
Catherine Faux, triathlete
Hazel Findlay, rock climber
Matt Fitzpatrick, golfer
David Ford, footballer, scored in 1966 F.A. Cup Final
William Foulke, aka "Fatty" Foulks; goalkeeper
Trevor Francis, footballer and football manager
David Fraser-Darling, cricketer
Redfern Froggatt, footballer
Paul Goodison, sailor
Herol 'Bomber' Graham, boxer
Andrew Griffiths, field hockey forward
Keith Hackett, football referee
Naseem Hamed, boxer
Ernest Harper, Olympic athlete
Cuth Harrison, racing driver
Donna Hartley, Olympic sprinter and Commonwealth gold medalist
David Hirst, footballer
Emlyn Hughes, footballer and football manager
Ritchie Humphreys, footballer, EX PFA Chairman
Brendan Ingle, boxing trainer
Adam Johnson, cricketer
Paul Jones, boxer
Nick Matthew, squash player
Reg Matthewson, footballer
Harry Maguire, footballer
Ray McHale, footballer
Don Megson, footballer
Gary Megson, footballer and football manager
Ben Moon, rock climber
John Motson, football commentator
Kyle Naughton, footballer
Johnny Nelson, boxer
Jon Newsome, footballer
 Carlton Palmer, footballer
 Walt Palmer, footballer
Tony Parkes, assistant football manager
Steve Peat, professional cyclist; three-time UCI downhill world cup overall series champion
Albert Quixall, footballer
Jamie Reeves, winner of World's Strongest Man
Uriah Rennie, football referee
Ryan Rhodes, boxer
Dave Richards, Chairman of FA Premier League and former Chairman of Sheffield Wednesday
Mark Roe, professional golfer, coach and commentator
Joe Root, England and Yorkshire cricketer
Alan Rouse, mountaineer
Jackie Sewell, footballer
Billy Sharp, footballer
David Sherwood, tennis player
John Sherwood, international 400 metre hurdler
Sheila Sherwood, international long jumper 1962–1974
Ron Shudra, former NHL player
Joe Simpson, mountaineer
Jim Smith, footballer and football manager
Timothy Smith, cricketer
Ron Springett, football goalkeeper
Mel Sterland, footballer
Roger Taylor, tennis player, Wimbledon semi-finalist 1973
Tommy Thorpe, footballer and cricketer
Geoff Thompson, chairman of the Football Association
Will Thursfield, footballer
George Ulyett, test cricketer
Jamie Vardy, footballer
Michael Vaughan, captain of England cricket team (2003–2008)
Chris Waddle, England footballer
Edward Wainwright, test cricketer
Kyle Walker, footballer, England right-back
Neil Warnock, footballer and football manager
Nicky Weaver, goalkeeper
Chris Wilder, football manager and former player
Howard Wilkinson, football manager
Danny Willett, professional golfer
Justin Wilson, motor-racing driver
Stefan Wilson, motor-racing driver
Dennis Woodhead, footballer 1947–1959
Chris Woods, football goalkeeper
Clinton Woods, boxer
Nigel Worthington, footballer and football manager
Harry Wragg, jockey and trainer
Harry Wright, major league baseball player

Others
Major William Barnsley Allen VC DSO MC and Bar, recipient of the Victoria Cross during World War I; born in Sheffield
Felicia Dorothea Kate Dover, notorious poisoner.
Arnold Loosemore, World War I soldier awarded the Victoria Cross
Charles Peace, notorious murderer

References

Sheffield (famous residents)
 
People from Sheffield